Paul Vivian Overy (14 February 1940 – 7 August 2008) was a British art historian and critic who was an authority on De Stijl.

Selected publications
 Edouard Manet, 1967
 De Stijl, 1969
 Kandinsky: The Language of the Eye, 1969
 The Rietveld Schröder House, 1988 (co-author)
 The Complete Furniture of Gerrit Rietveld, 1993 (co-author)
 Light, Air and Openness, Modern Architecture Between the Wars, 2008.

References 

1940 births
2008 deaths
People from Dorchester, Dorset
English art critics
English art historians